Payment in Blood is a 1967 Italian Spaghetti Western film. It represents the official film debut for director Enzo G. Castellari of Few Dollars for Django. The film stars Edd Byrnes and Guy Madison.

Plot
Following the American Civil War a bunch of deserter Confederate soldiers dwell in Mexico and make a living on terrorising the villages around. Bounty hunter Stuart and his assistant Manuela put a crackdown on these misdeeds.

Cast 
 Edd Byrnes as Stuart
 Guy Madison as  Colonel Thomas Blake
 Ennio Girolami as Chamaco Gonzales
 Luisa Baratto as Manuela
 Federico Boido as Fred

Production
Payment in Blood was described by Italian film historian Roberto Curti as Castellari's "official" debut, as it was the first time the director was credited as a director after going uncredited on films such as Some Dollars for Django and A Ghentar si muore facile. The film was shot in Spain with Castellari intentionally trying to duplicate the style of a film that made an impression on him, Sidney J. Furie's The Appaloosa.

Releases
Payment in Blood passed the Italian censors on  29 March 1967. It was first released in 1967.

Reception
In contemporary reviews, "Murf." of Variety described Payment in Blood as "a gamy slapdash and overly violent Civil War oater drama, made by crude Italian film hands and probably exported in hopes that names of Edd Byrnes and Guy Madison might have the b.o prospects."

References

Notes

Bibliography

External links
 

Films directed by Enzo G. Castellari
Films scored by Francesco De Masi
Spaghetti Western films
1967 Western (genre) films
1967 films
1960s Italian films